Leptomiza calcearia is a moth in the  family Geometridae. It is found in Taiwan, Bhutan and India.

The wingspan is 36–42 mm.

Subspecies
Leptomiza calcearia calcearia
Leptomiza calcearia apoleuca Wehrli, 1940

References

Moths described in 1860
Ourapterygini
Moths of Asia
Moths of Taiwan